The Lieutenant William F. Callahan Jr. Tunnel (colloquially Callahan Tunnel) is one of four tunnels, and one of three road tunnels, beneath Boston Harbor in Boston, Massachusetts. It carries motor vehicles from the North End to Logan International Airport and Route 1A in East Boston. Ordinarily, this tunnel is only used to carry traffic out of the city, and with the completion of the Big Dig it only collects traffic from I-93 southbound (right after traffic merges from Storrow Drive) and downtown Boston; northbound traffic uses the Ted Williams Tunnel. As of 2016, a toll of $1.50 is charged for non-commercial two-axle vehicles with a Massachusetts E-ZPass, while non-Massachusetts E-ZPass holders are charged $1.75. Vehicles without E-ZPass are charged $2.05 through MassDOT's Pay By Plate MA program. For residents of certain Boston ZIP codes, a discount is in effect using an E-ZPass transponder, costing $0.20.

Alternatives

Traffic flowing between Logan International Airport and directions south of the city on I-93 and west of the city on the Massachusetts Turnpike (I-90) normally uses the Ted Williams Tunnel rather than the Callahan and Sumner Tunnels. Airport traffic can also use East Boston surface roads to and from Chelsea (Chelsea Street Bridge), Revere (Massachusetts Route 1A) and Winthrop (Massachusetts Route 145).

History

The tunnel was opened in 1961. It was named for the son of Turnpike chairman William F. Callahan, who was killed in Italy days before the end of World War II.

In 2016, cashless tolling systems were installed in both directions, entering the Sumner Tunnel and exiting the Callahan Tunnel as part of a plan to modernize toll collection the Boston area.

Historically, control signals were used to reverse the direction of one lane in this tunnel or the Sumner Tunnel, when the opposite tunnel was closed for maintenance or emergencies. Under the relevant Turnpike regulations, a yellow signal light means "proceed only as directed", on penalty of a $50 fine. As the signals are almost always yellow, this rule is universally ignored by drivers. Other markings in the tunnel include a "double white line" in the center, intended to discourage drivers from changing lanes, to be penalized with a $100 fine.

The Callahan Tunnel was repaired in the 1990s.

A major overhaul began in December 2013, which completely replaced the deck, curbs, and wall panels; and cleaned and repaired its ceiling and vent systems (above the ceiling and below the deck). It was planned for three phases: complete closure from December 27, 2013 to March 12, 2014 during deck and curb replacement; closures 11pm-5am from March 13, 2014 to late August 2014 for wall panel replacement; and final work until November 2014. McCourt Construction of South Boston was awarded the $19.3 million contract in August. During closures, Logan-bound traffic was diverted into the Ted Williams Tunnel, Tobin Bridge, and Massachusetts Route 1A South via Revere or East Boston. Starting with the Accelerated Bridge Program in the late 2000s, MassDOT began employing accelerated construction techniques, in which it signed contracts with incentives for early completion and penalties for late completion, and used intense construction during longer periods of complete closure to shorten the overall project duration and reduce cost. These techniques were also used for the Callahan Tunnel Rehabilitation Project.

References

See also

 Sumner Tunnel
 Ted Williams Tunnel
 Thomas P. O'Neill Jr. Tunnel
 Massachusetts Turnpike
 Zakim Bunker Hill Bridge
 MBTA's East Boston Tunnel

Boston Harbor
Road tunnels in Massachusetts
Tunnels in Boston
U.S. Route 1
Interstate 93
Tunnels completed in 1961
Toll tunnels in Massachusetts